San Paolo Apostolo is a Roman Catholic church located facing the Piazza della Libertà in the upper town of Civitanova Marche (Civitanova Alta), in the province of Macerata, region of Marche, Italy.

History
The church was first erected in 1212, and made a collegiate church in 1592 by pope Clement VIII. In 1734–1753, the church was entirely rebuilt under designs of Pietro Loni; the former layout had the church transverse to the piazza. The sober brick facade has two bell towers.

The reconstruction razed the town clock and watch tower. The interior conserves a painting depicting the Nativity of the Virgin (15th century) by Andrea Briotti and a depiction of the Crucifixionby Durante Nobili. The organ is attributed to Antonio Callido. The baptismal font from the 15th century has part of a Roman capital linked to the martyrdom of St Marone.

References

18th-century Roman Catholic church buildings in Italy
Neoclassical architecture in le Marche
Roman Catholic churches in Civitanova Marche
Roman Catholic churches completed in 1753
Neoclassical church buildings in Italy